Elizaveta Dmitriyevna Makarova (born 17 June 1994) is a Russian pair skater who competed internationally for Bulgaria with Leri Kenchadze. They became the 2013 Toruń Cup champions, 2015 Bavarian Open bronze medalists, and four-time Bulgarian national champions. The pair competed at four European Championships and three World Championships.

Earlier in her career, Makarova competed for four seasons with Alexei Shemet in Russia.

Programs 
(with Kenchadze)

Competitive highlights 
CS: Challenger Series

With Kenchadze for Bulgaria

With Shemet

References

External links 

 

1994 births
Bulgarian pair skaters
Living people
Russian emigrants to Bulgaria
Figure skaters from Moscow
Figure skaters from Sofia